The 1956 Rutgers Scarlet Knights football team represented Rutgers University in the 1956 NCAA University Division football season. In their first season under head coach John Stiegman, the Scarlet Knights compiled a 3–7 record and were outscored by their opponents 240 to 117. The team's statistical leaders included William Gatyas with 450 passing yards, Billy Austin 380 rushing yards and Jay Hunton with 408 receiving yards.

Schedule

References

Rutgers
Rutgers Scarlet Knights football seasons
Rutgers Scarlet Knights football